George Prance (1827 – April 3, 1885) was a sailor in the U.S. Navy during the American Civil War. He received the Medal of Honor for his actions during the Second Battle of Fort Fisher on January 15, 1865.

Military service
Immigrating from his native France, Prance volunteered for service in the U.S. Navy and was assigned  to the Union sloop-of-war . His enlistment is credited to the state of Massachusetts.

On January 15, 1865, the North Carolina Confederate stronghold of Fort Fisher was taken by a combined Union storming party of sailors, marines, and soldiers under the command of Admiral David Dixon Porter and General Alfred Terry.  Prance directed fire from the Ticonderoga's guns upon Fort Fisher.

Medal of Honor citation

Death and burial
Medal of Honor recipient George Prance died April 3, 1885 of a self-inflicted gunshot and was buried in Mountain View Cemetery (Oakland, California).

Prance's death notice in the April 4, 1885 Daily Alta newspaper read:

An inquest was held last evening on the remains of George Prance, who shot himself yesterday at the Park House, Temescal. The jury found that the deceased was a native of France, single, sixty years of age, and that he came to his death from a bullet wound, inflicted with suicidal intent. Prance had been employed on a dredger in the Oakland harbor, and lately had been drinking heavily. He was a member of the George H. Thomas Post, G. A. R. It is believed that his suicide was occasioned by the failure of the Legislature to pass a bill to reimburse him for an eye lost by an injury received while in the employ of the Harbor Commissioners.

See also

List of Medal of Honor recipients
List of American Civil War Medal of Honor recipients: M–P

References

1827 births
1885 deaths
United States Navy Medal of Honor recipients
Union Navy sailors
French-born Medal of Honor recipients
French emigrants to the United States
People of Massachusetts in the American Civil War
American Civil War recipients of the Medal of Honor